The Flora-Bama Lounge and Package (or The Flora-Bama) is a honky-tonk bar located in Orange Beach, Alabama, adjacent to the Alabama-Florida state line, from which it draws its name. It calls itself "America's Last Great Roadhouse".

Bar

The Flora-Bama was originally constructed in 1964, two years after the road (Alabama State Route 182) connecting Orange Beach, AL with Perdido Key, FL was completed. In the early days of the Flora-Bama, the lounge was practically the only thing in the area. As traffic began to increase along the new highway, business grew and the lounge grew to match it with new construction added piecemeal to accommodate the larger crowds. At the time it was established Escambia County, Florida, in which it is located was "wet" while across the line Baldwin County, Alabama, was "dry".  In 1978, the Flora-Bama was sold to Joe Gilchrist and Pat McClellan, who remain co-owners of the bar today. In 2009 John McInnis and Cameron Price became co-owners of the Flora-Bama along with Joe and Pat to carry it into the next 50 years.

Widely known as a place where "you can have a millionaire sitting next to a biker," this unique make-up of bar patrons is one of the contributing factors to its large appeal and attraction. Locals mingle with tourists rather easily and on large holiday weekends such as Memorial Day, Fourth of July, and Labor Day, cars line the highway for miles in both directions as the bar draws such a large crowd. It is also a frequent weekend outing for local junior officers of nearby NAS Pensacola. The Flora-Bama first gained national attention when former Oakland Raiders and Alabama quarterback and NFL MVP Kenny Stabler referred to the Flora-Bama as "The best watering hole in the country".

The establishment is referred to by locals as simply "the Bama" and before its partial destruction by Hurricane Ivan, it boasted in the range of 20 bars on the grounds. In addition, up to 4 live bands could be playing simultaneously providing a wide array of music for visitors to enjoy. The bar is primarily outdoors, and before its destruction by Hurricane Ivan, offered a huge deck where one can eat and drink while having a beautiful view of the Gulf of Mexico. In 2010 the bar was rebuilt from hurricane damage using most of the materials from the original bar destroyed by Hurricane Ivan in 2004.

The Bushwacker

The Bama serves a local favorite known as the "Bushwacker". For the tourists visiting the area, the drink is a frozen concoction that has a coffee-esque taste and can be found at many bars around the area. The Flora-Bama Bushwhacker has contributed to the bar's world famous status. Some say that a few Flora-Bama Bushwackers will give you the best time you do not remember.

Hurricane Ivan

In September 2004, Hurricane Ivan directly hit the Flora-Bama, which caused catastrophic damage. The main building at the entrance was destroyed, and most of the other sections of the bar were either destroyed or heavily damaged. The Flora-Bama shut down for the first few days in over 40 years and reopened serving only coolers, ice and beer. The original Top Deck survived without significant damage, and the Stair Bar below, though sand-laden, remained intact. The stairs from the Deck Bar to the Top Deck remained, but the main stage area near the Deck Bar lost its roof, which has since been replaced with a tent-like canopy. From 2004 to 2010 the Flora-Bama operated out of tents, trailers, and plywood shacks until the main bar was rebuilt.

Rebuilding

In 2010 reconstruction began to restore the Flora-Bama. The main bar was rebuilt similarly to the old bar but elevated, to survive another storm. The owners recycled materials from the original bar, including wooden walls and old bar tops. Some patrons donated material to repair other areas of the bar.

The Flora-Bama converted an old tool shed and camper gazebo into a kitchen and bar named "The Flora-Bama Yacht Club," which has an open air waterfront restaurant.

Recovery

Despite being closed during repair and reconstruction, patrons returned as soon as it reopened. Featuring daily live music, often with five bands on Saturdays, it still attracts celebrity visitors, such as Peyton Manning, Eli Manning, Kid Rock, Ken Stabler, A. J. McCarron, Kenny Chesney, Vince Vaughn, Jimmy Buffett, and others.

Hosted events

The Flora-Bama Lounge is host to a number of annual and one-time local events. Perhaps most famous of these festivities is the World Famous Annual Interstate Mullet Toss, where individuals compete on the beach throwing a mullet (fish) from a 10 foot circle in Florida across the state line into Alabama. Not only is the Mullet Toss a great excuse to throw a weekend long party, but contributions are made to local charities, mostly to youth organizations. Winning throws approach distances in excess of 150 feet and the event is always held in the last full weekend of April (exception 2011, Moved to last April 29-May 2). Additional events include the "Polar Bear Dip," the "Mullet Man Triathlon," "Super Bowl Chili Cook-off" , "Shindig on the Sand", "Flora-Bama Fishing Rodeo" and "Bulls on the Beach". The Flora-Bama is also home to one of the oldest and largest songwriters festival in the word, The Frank Brown International Songwriters Festival. The Flora-Bama has dozens of events every year, but there is a party 365 days a year.

The Jimmy Buffett song "Bama Breeze" was written about this roadhouse as well as others (although the video for the song was made at the ruins of The Firedog Saloon in Bay St. Louis, Mississippi, another popular beach bar, that was destroyed by Hurricane Katrina in 2005). This is a direct quote from Jimmy's sister: "My brother Jimmy’s recording of 'The Bama Breeze' was his homage to coastal dives, particularly the famous Flora-Bama on the beach at the Alabama–Florida State line.  He sent me a little love both when he changed the lyrics to call the bar owner "LuLu" and when he asked me if I wanted to play the bar owner in the video.  I mused for just a second, thinking…hmmm… a woman who owns a bar, drinking a beer, jumps up on the stage and sings with the band.  It wasn't much of a stretch!  I had crazy fun shooting the video but I'm glad I have my day job!"

Kenny Chesney held a free concert at the Flora-Bama August 16, 2014 to promote his new album The Big Revival as well as his newest song "Flora-Bama", which was written about the bar.  The concert was Chesney's only appearance of 2014.

Songs about Flora-Bama

The Flora-Bama has been mentioned or written about countless times by songwriters from all over the world. Some of the most recognizable artists include:

 Kenny Chesney: "Flora-Bama"
 Kenny Chesney: "Coastal"
 Jimmy Buffett: "Bama Breeze", "Rag Top Day"
 Chris Young: "Lighters in the Air"
 JJ Grey & Mofro: "Florabama"
 Blake Shelton: "Good Ole Boys"
 Jason Aldean: "Tattoo's on this Town"—This song was not written about Flora-Bama and it is not mentioned but Aldean shot his Vevo GoShow for the song in The Flora-Bama.
 Neil Dover: "Flora-Bama Time"
Riley Green: "Bury Me In Dixie"

Also, Gulf Coast Country Artist, Neil Dover released his new video, "FloraBamaTime" in August 2015; a song from his latest album, "Looking for You" which was released earlier in the year. You can find Neil playing at the "Florabama" Lounge every Wednesday and  "Neil's Sand Ole Opry" Show takes place across the street at the Flora-Bama Yacht Club every Sunday.

References

External links
 Flora-Bama website
 Perdido Key website
 Worship @ The Water, review by a Mystery Worshiper from the Ship of Fools 
 https://web.archive.org/web/20080820060539/http://www.thelastamericanroadhouse.com/
 

Drinking establishments in Florida
Nightclubs in Florida
Buildings and structures in Pensacola, Florida
Tourist attractions in Pensacola, Florida
Oyster bars
1964 establishments in Florida
Honky-tonks